Don O'Neill may refer to:
 Don O'Neill (artist)
 Don O'Neill (fashion designer)